Arianne Jones (born September 21, 1990) is a Canadian luger who has competed since 2005. Jones has also qualified to compete for Canada at the 2014 Winter Olympics in Sochi, Russia by winning a last chance race off with another teammate. She placed 13th overall in the 2014 Olympic Games, with other outstanding achievements including her first bronze medal in the 2014 Calgary Luge World Cup and a gold medal in the Team Relay portion of 2016 Winterberg Luge World Cup in Germany.

Career 
Jones attributes her start in luge to a recruitment camp held at Canada Olympic Park, following the 2002 Winter Olympics in Park City, Utah. Beginning her career at the age of twelve, she worked her way to an elite level through competing in junior national competitions for four years, reaching World Cup level in the 2010–2011 season.

With a stature smaller than many of her competitors, Jones has had to face a different set of challenges than most luge athletes competing at an elite level. Dubbed the "pint-sized wonder" by many of her peers, she has proved that hard work and resilience can push past barriers that might normally hinder her ability to compete. Throughout her World Cup career, Jones has boasted top-fifteen results every season since her debut in 2010.

References

External links
 

1990 births
Canadian female lugers
Living people
Lugers at the 2014 Winter Olympics
Olympic lugers of Canada
Lugers from Calgary